Dominique Mainard is a French translator of English novels, short story writer and novelist. She was born in Paris, France, in 1967 and grew up in the region of Lyon, and spent five years in the United States. She won the 2009 Prix des Libraires (Booksellers Prize) for her novel Pour vous (For You).  Mainard spent 2005 - 2006 as a resident  of   the  Randell Cottage Writers' Trust in Wellington, New Zealand. Her book Leur histoire was adapted for the 2005 film  Les Mots bleus by  director Alain Corneau  with actors Sergi López and Sylvie Testud.

Works

Translations

English novels, including authors John Cheever and Janet Frame

Collections of short stories

Le Grenadier (1997), Gallimard
La Maison des fatigués Editions Joëlle Losfeld
Le Second Enfant. Prix Prométhée de la nouvelle (Prometheus Prize for Novels)

Novels
Le Grand Fakir (2001), EditionsJoelle Losfeld
Leur histoire  (2002), Joëlle Losfeld editions. Fnac Novel Prize and Alain-Fournier Prize.

Le Ciel des chevaux  (2004), Editions Joelle Losfeld
Je voudrais tant que tu te souviennes  (2007), Joëlle Losfeld editions. France Culture Book Award - Télérama 2007. There is an Italian translation by Edizioni Saecula
Pour vous (2008), Joëlle Losfeld editions. Booksellers Award 2009.

Novella
La Vie en rose (2007), Éditions du Chemin de fer

Youth
Ma vie en 17 pieds (2008), L'École des loisirs

References

Writers from Paris
1967 births
Living people
French women writers
French translators
Prix des libraires winners
Prix Alain-Fournier winners